Zheleznogorsky (masculine), Zheleznogorskaya (feminine), or Zheleznogorskoye (neuter) are Russian place names, and may refer to:

 Zheleznogorsky District, a district in Kursk Oblast
 Zheleznogorskoye Urban Settlement, a municipal incorporation of the town of Zheleznogorsk-Ilimsky in Nizhneilimsky District of Irkutsk Oblast

See also 
 Zheleznogorsk (disambiguation)